Vandichakkaram is a 1980 Indian Tamil-language film directed by K. Vijayan and written by Vinu Chakravarthy. The film stars Sivakumar and Saritha. It revolves around a ruffian who, after falling in love, resolves to mend his ways.

Chakravarthy wrote the script in 1976, but production began only in 1979. It was supposed to be the 100th film of Sivakumar but eventually became his 101st to accommodate Rosappu Ravikkaikari (1979). The film was produced by Thirupur Mani, and shot at Mysore. It is also the debut film of Silk Smitha.

Vandichakkaram was released on 29 August 1980, and became one of the biggest hits of Sivakumar. At the Filmfare Awards South, he and Saritha won the awards for Best Tamil Actor and Best Tamil Actress respectively. The film also won the Tamil Nadu State Film Award for Best Film—Third Prize. It was later remade in Hindi as Prem Pratigyaa (1989).

Plot 

Gaja is a ruffian. After falling in love with Vadivu, he resolves to mend his ways.

Cast 
Sivakumar as Gaja
Saritha as Vadivu
Sivachandran as Sarathi
Samikannu as Palayam
Suruli Rajan as Maari
Vinu Chakravarthy as Muthu
A. Sakunthala as a thief
Smitha as Silk

Production 

Vinu Chakravarthy wrote the script of Vandichakkaram in 1976, but production began only in 1979. This was supposed to be the 100th film of Sivakumar but eventually became his 101st so that Rosappu Ravikkaikari (1979) could become his 100th. The film featured Sivakumar portraying a ruffian, completely different from the soft roles which he was portraying at that point of his career. This was the feature film debut of Vijayalakshmi, who later became known as the sex symbol Silk Smitha. According to Vinu Chakravarthy, he "chiseled" her character during the writing process for almost three years before production began. Since the film demanded a vegetable market situated in a straight line, the crew zeroed on a market place in Mysore where the film was shot. Smitha's voice was dubbed by Hema Malini.

Soundtrack 
The music composed by Shankar–Ganesh, and lyrics were penned by Pulamaipithan.

Release and reception 

Vandichakkaram was released on 29 August 1980, and became one of the biggest hits of Sivakumar. Writing for Kalki, Nalini Sastry said Vijayan was not pushing the cartwheel on the ground, but into the sky. At the Filmfare Awards South, Sivakumar and Saritha won the awards for Best Tamil Actor and Best Tamil Actress respectively. The film also won the Tamil Nadu State Film Award for Best Film—Third Prize.

References

External links 
 

1980 films
1980s Tamil-language films
Films directed by K. Vijayan
Films scored by Shankar–Ganesh
Tamil films remade in other languages